Schwanden may refer to:

Schwanden bei Brienz, a municipality in the canton of Berne, Switzerland
Schwanden (Glarus), a village in the canton of Glarus, Switzerland
Schwanden (Sigriswil), a village in the municipality of Sigriswil in the canton of Berne, Switzerland